Major General George Bell Jr. (January 22, 1859 – October 29, 1926) was a United States Army officer who is most notable for commanding the 33rd Division, an Army National Guard formation, during the final year of World War I.

Early life and start of military career
Born at Fort McHenry in Baltimore, Maryland and the son of Brigadier General George Bell (1828–1907), a veteran of the American Civil War, and his wife, Isabella McCormick Bell, he attended the United States Military Academy (USMA) at West Point, New York. Among his fellow classmates there were several men who would, like Bell himself, eventually attain the rank of general officer, such as Charles J. Bailey, Henry G. Sharpe, William C. Rafferty, Frederick S. Strong, William C. Scott, Wilds P. Richardson, John L. Chamberlain, and George Washington Goethals.

After graduating in 1880 he was posted to assignments throughout the country, including Fort Maginnis, Fort Shaw, Fort Ellis, Fort Snelling, and Fort Missoula. In the 1890s he served as Professor of Military Science at Cornell University. In 1894 he received a law degree from Cornell and passed the New York bar exam.

Later career

He served in the Spanish–American War's Santiago Campaign and the Samar Campaign of the Philippine Insurrection. In 1907 Bell was appointed to the Infantry Equipment Board, taking part in the design of many items that were later used in World War I.

In 1913 Bell assumed command of the 16th Regiment at The Presidio in San Francisco. In 1916 he was promoted to brigadier general and assigned to head the El Paso District during the Pancho Villa Expedition.

World War I

Shortly after the American entry into World War I in April 1917, Bell was promoted to major general and assigned to command the Illinois National Guard's 33rd Division. He commanded throughout the war, with the 33rd, after months of strenuous training in the United States and arriving on the Western Front in May 1918, attaining distinction as the only American division to fight under its own flag and as part of British Empire (Australian) and French corps. The 33rd Division, under Bell's leadership, took part in the Battle of Hamel, the Second Battle of the Somme, the Battle of Saint-Mihiel and the Meuse–Argonne offensive, the largest battle in the history of the U.S. Army. By the time the war ended due to the Armistice with Germany in November 1918, the division had sustained over 6,800 casualties.

William H. Simpson served alongside Bell throughout most of the American involvement in the war. He later became a full general and commanded the U.S. Ninth Army in World War II from 1944−1945.

Post World War I
After the war he commanded the Sixth Corps Area, with headquarters in Chicago, Illinois until reaching the mandatory retirement in 1923 at age 64.

Awards and decorations
Bell's awards included the Distinguished Service Medal, and his foreign honors included the French Croix de Guerre with Palm and the Legion of Honor, as well as appointment as a Knight Commander of England's Order of St. Michael and St. George. The citation to his Army DSM reads:

Post military career
After leaving the Army, Bell was elected President of Chicago's Hill State Bank.

Death and burial
Bell died in Chicago on October 29, 1926.  He was buried in Chicago's Rosehill Cemetery and Mausoleum.

Legacy
Illinois' Bell Bowl Prairie amphitheater and Chicago's Bell Park and George Bell American Legion Post are named for him.  Fort Bell in Bermuda was also named for him.

References

Bibliography

External links

Distinguished Service Medal Citation, George Bell Jr., Military Times Hall of Valor

|-

1859 births
1926 deaths
United States Army Infantry Branch personnel
Military personnel from Baltimore
People from Chicago
United States Military Academy alumni
United States Army generals
United States Army personnel of the Indian Wars
American military personnel of the Spanish–American War
Recipients of the Distinguished Service Medal (US Army)
Recipients of the Croix de Guerre 1914–1918 (France)
Recipients of the Legion of Honour
Cornell University faculty
United States Army generals of World War I
Burials at Rosehill Cemetery